The Hale Boggs Federal Complex, also known as the Hale Boggs Federal Building-Courthouse, is a historic building in New Orleans, Louisiana. It was built in 1976. It was designed in the Modernist architectural style. It was named in honor of Democratic Congressman Hale Boggs who disappeared over Alaska in 1972.

References

External links

1962 establishments in Louisiana
Office buildings completed in 1976
Office buildings in New Orleans
Modernist architecture in Louisiana